Glycera (the sweet one) was a popular name often used for Hellenistic hetaerae, held by:

The daughter of Thalassis and the mistress of Harpalus and Menander. (Athen. xiii. pp. 586, 595, 605, &c.)
The mistress of Pausias, born in Sicyon.
A favourite of Horace(?). (Hor. Carm. i. 19. 30. iii. 19.29.)
Nominally, Alcibiades's sexual partner in Caracci's engravings for I Modi.

Greek given names